Moscow City Duma District 33 is one of 45 constituencies in Moscow City Duma. The constituency covers parts Butovo in South-Western Moscow since 2014. In 1993-2005 District 33 was based in Strogino and Khoroshyovo-Mnyovniki, however, after the number of constituencies was reduced to 15 in 2005, the constituency was eliminated.

Members elected

Election results

2001

|-
! colspan=2 style="background-color:#E9E9E9;text-align:left;vertical-align:top;" |Candidate
! style="background-color:#E9E9E9;text-align:left;vertical-align:top;" |Party
! style="background-color:#E9E9E9;text-align:right;" |Votes
! style="background-color:#E9E9E9;text-align:right;" |%
|-
|style="background-color:"|
|align=left|Aleksandr Kovalyov
|align=left|Independent
|
|28.69%
|-
|style="background-color:"|
|align=left|Tamara Shorina
|align=left|Independent
|
|24.42%
|-
|style="background-color:"|
|align=left|Aleksandr Krutov
|align=left|Communist Party
|
|18.60%
|-
|style="background-color:"|
|align=left|Yury Zelikovich
|align=left|Independent
|
|8.68%
|-
|style="background-color:"|
|align=left|Sergey Maksimov
|align=left|Independent
|
|2.10%
|-
|style="background-color:#000000"|
|colspan=2 |against all
|
|13.81%
|-
| colspan="5" style="background-color:#E9E9E9;"|
|- style="font-weight:bold"
| colspan="3" style="text-align:left;" | Total
| 
| 100%
|-
| colspan="5" style="background-color:#E9E9E9;"|
|- style="font-weight:bold"
| colspan="4" |Source:
|
|}

2014

|-
! colspan=2 style="background-color:#E9E9E9;text-align:left;vertical-align:top;" |Candidate
! style="background-color:#E9E9E9;text-align:left;vertical-align:top;" |Party
! style="background-color:#E9E9E9;text-align:right;" |Votes
! style="background-color:#E9E9E9;text-align:right;" |%
|-
|style="background-color:"|
|align=left|Lyudmila Guseva
|align=left|United Russia
|
|55.82%
|-
|style="background-color:"|
|align=left|Anton Tarasov
|align=left|Communist Party
|
|18.10%
|-
|style="background-color:"|
|align=left|Aleksandr Popov
|align=left|Yabloko
|
|9.24%
|-
|style="background-color:"|
|align=left|Platon Grekov
|align=left|Liberal Democratic Party
|
|7.07%
|-
|style="background-color:"|
|align=left|Vyacheslav Makarov
|align=left|A Just Russia
|
|6.47%
|-
| colspan="5" style="background-color:#E9E9E9;"|
|- style="font-weight:bold"
| colspan="3" style="text-align:left;" | Total
| 
| 100%
|-
| colspan="5" style="background-color:#E9E9E9;"|
|- style="font-weight:bold"
| colspan="4" |Source:
|
|}

2019

|-
! colspan=2 style="background-color:#E9E9E9;text-align:left;vertical-align:top;" |Candidate
! style="background-color:#E9E9E9;text-align:left;vertical-align:top;" |Party
! style="background-color:#E9E9E9;text-align:right;" |Votes
! style="background-color:#E9E9E9;text-align:right;" |%
|-
|style="background-color:"|
|align=left|Lyudmila Guseva (incumbent)
|align=left|Independent
|
|40.83%
|-
|style="background-color:"|
|align=left|Levon Smirnov
|align=left|Communist Party
|
|32.00%
|-
|style="background-color:"|
|align=left|Vladimir Grinchenko
|align=left|Liberal Democratic Party
|
|8.87%
|-
|style="background-color:"|
|align=left|Pavel Fedorov
|align=left|Communists of Russia
|
|7.74%
|-
|style="background-color:"|
|align=left|Viktor Prisnyak
|align=left|Rodina
|
|4.11%
|-
|style="background-color:"|
|align=left|Garegin Papyan
|align=left|A Just Russia
|
|3.21%
|-
| colspan="5" style="background-color:#E9E9E9;"|
|- style="font-weight:bold"
| colspan="3" style="text-align:left;" | Total
| 
| 100%
|-
| colspan="5" style="background-color:#E9E9E9;"|
|- style="font-weight:bold"
| colspan="4" |Source:
|
|}

References

Moscow City Duma districts